Michelangelo Crispi (born 5 February 1972) is an Italian lightweight rower. He won a gold medal at the 1994 World Rowing Championships in Indianapolis with the lightweight men's double scull.

References

1972 births
Living people
Italian male rowers
World Rowing Championships medalists for Italy
Olympic rowers of Italy
Rowers at the 1996 Summer Olympics